, known by his stage name , was a Japanese musician known as guitarist and lead songwriter of the visual kei rock band Raphael. The group became quite popular, with all their releases entering the top 40 of the Oricon chart, before disbanding after Kazuki died at the age of 19.

Life 
Kazuki Watanabe was born on April 7, 1981 in Shibuya, Tokyo. After playing some roles in a few TV programs and a film, he went on to have a musical career. In 1995, he and bassist Yukito formed a punk cover band which covered songs by bands such as The Blue Hearts and Ramones. In 1996, Kazuki and Yukito both soon began writing original material, and later formed Raphael in 1997,  whose members were all just 15 years old. In only three years time they were popular enough to headline the Nippon Budokan.

He also had a side-project called , a band consisted of Kazuki (vocals), Kuruto (ex-Pleur) on bass and Mask on guitar. All of their songs are instrumental because Kazuki died before he could record his voice. On October 31, 2000, he was found dead in his room located in Ebisu, Shibuya. He was 19 years old. The cause of death was reported as a sedative overdose, according to the Shibuya Police in Tokyo.

After his death, Raphael disbanded in January 2001. In 2012, they reunited for two concerts on October 31 (Kazuki's 12th death anniversary) and November 1, and released a re-recording of their hit 1999 song "Eternal Wish (Todokanu Kimi e)" as a single.

References

External links
 Official site

Visual kei musicians
Japanese rock guitarists
Japanese songwriters
Drug-related suicides in Japan
Musicians from Shibuya
1981 births
2000 suicides
20th-century Japanese musicians
20th-century guitarists